Red Creek Wildlife Management Area was established from land owned by the U.S. Forest Service and is located within the De Soto National Forest off Mississippi Highway 15.

Use permits and regulations

Wildlife Management Area User Permits are required for persons engaged in hunting, fishing or trapping.  Camping and the use of horses and off-road vehicles are governed by U.S. Forest Service regulations.

Game animals
The principal game animals that can be legally harvested on the WMA, in accordance with State hunting regulations, include whitetail deer, wild turkey, gray squirrel, fox squirrel, rabbit, raccoon, opossum, and bobcat.  Wild hogs may be hunted as nuisance animals but only during open hunting seasons.  On rare occasion, a black bear may be seen on the WMA, but hunting or disturbance of bears is prohibited.

Habitat
Longleaf-slash pine is the dominant forest cover type on Red Creek WMA.  Associated tree species include loblolly and shortleaf pines, oaks, gums (blackgum and sweetgum), and flowering dogwood.  Associated shrubs and ground vegetation include gallberry, yaupon, wax-myrtle, sumac, blackberry, saw palmetto, and broomsedge.

References

De Soto National Forest
Protected areas of Stone County, Mississippi
Protected areas of George County, Mississippi
Protected areas of Jackson County, Mississippi
Wildlife management areas of Mississippi